is a Japanese word which refers to someone of a lower position overthrowing someone of a higher position using military or political might, seizing power. It is variously translated as "the lower rules the higher" or "the low overcomes the high".

History 
The term originated from Sui dynasty China. In Japan, it came into use during the Kamakura period.

Instances of gekokujō date back to the Sengoku period. Through the chaotic political climate of the era, Oda Nobunaga and Toyotomi Hideyoshi were able to create fervour and acquire political and military power. In 1588, Hideyoshi ordered the sword hunt, a nationwide confiscation of weapons, to try and prevent further insurrection. After the shogunate was established, social mobility and the freedom of soldiers and farmers was restricted to try and prevent further gekokujō. The Tokugawa shogunate adopted a Confucian system of social stratification, which put all members of society into distinct groups, making it unlikely for anyone to leave their given social class.

During the early Showa period, repeated acts of gekokujō influenced the Japanese government, creating an ultranationalist and aggressive foreign policy in the process. The Imperial Way Faction were responsible for attempting to assassinate many public figures in the 1920s and 1930s, including the visiting Charlie Chaplin, but were given light prison sentences because they received public support. Inspired by the Imperial Way Faction, the Kwantung Army orchestrated the Mukden Incident in 1931, leading to the Japanese invasion of Manchuria. British correspondent Hugh Byas describe the phenomenon as "government by assassination". Masanobu Tsuji (辻 政信) was a well known supporter of extreme gekokujō during World War II.

In art
 The February 26 Incident is prominently portrayed as an example of gekokujō in Yukio Mishima's Modernist short story "Patriotism", and serves as the backdrop for the events of the narrative.

See also
 Saigō Takamori
 Underdog

References

Further reading
 Sources of Japanese Tradition Volume 2 compiled by William T. de Bary, Carol Gluck and Arthur E. Tiedemann

Japanese words and phrases
Military history of Japan